Scout International Relief Service  was an organisation set up by the Scout Association in Britain in 1942 with the aim of sending teams of adult Scouters to do relief work in refugee and displaced persons' camps in Northwest Europe, Italy, Austria, Yugoslavia, Greece, Cyprus, Syria, Palestine, Egypt and Hong Kong after World War II.

References

International Scouting
Exile organizations
Displaced persons camps in the aftermath of World War II